Hayes-Byrum Store and House is a historic home, store, and national historic district located near Charlotte, Mecklenburg County, North Carolina. The store was built about 1890, and is a one-story, gable front, brick building. It measures 35 feet by 60 feet and has a wide, arched entrance with wooden double doors. North of the store is the two story, asymmetrical, Queen Anne style frame dwelling built about 1900. It has a cross-gable roof and features a cutaway bay. The store is considered the oldest surviving commercial building in rural Mecklenburg County.

It was added to the National Register of Historic Places in 1991.

References

Commercial buildings on the National Register of Historic Places in North Carolina
Houses on the National Register of Historic Places in North Carolina
Historic districts on the National Register of Historic Places in North Carolina
Queen Anne architecture in North Carolina
Commercial buildings completed in 1890
Houses completed in 1890
Houses in Mecklenburg County, North Carolina
National Register of Historic Places in Mecklenburg County, North Carolina